Variety Film Reviews is the 24-volume hardcover reprint of feature film reviews by the weekly entertainment tabloid-size magazine Variety from 1907 to 1996. Film reviews continued to be published in the weekly magazine after the reprints were discontinued.

Original series
From 1983 to 1985, Garland Publishing, which is now wholly owned by Routledge, published the first 15 volumes of review reprints. Their 16th volume is an alphabetical index of more than 50,000 titles. Perhaps 10% are alternate titles and original foreign titles, so 45,000 review reprints is a realistic estimate for the first 15 volumes.

Bi-annual supplements
The eight additional bi-annual volumes (for 1981–1996) have at least 15,000 additional reprinted film reviews, making an estimated total of 60,000 or more film reviews in the 24-volume series. Volume 18 has the title index for 1981–1984. Each subsequent volume includes its own title index.

Edition binding
The 19 volumes published by Garland are bound in green (Varietys traditional color) cloth with gold stamping. Each book measures 31.2 cm. (12¼ inches) high by 24 cm. (9¼ inches) wide.

Subsequent publisher
Garland's rights expired after publication of Volume 19, and publication rights were acquired by R.R. Bowker, then owned by Reed International, which also owned Variety. Bowker undertook a complete reprint of Volumes 1 through 19, changing the title page of each volume to reflect their own imprint, and changing the series name to Variety's Film Reviews. The re-titled series was bound in brown Kivar, or a similar imitation leather binding material. Bowker published the original editions of Volumes 20 through 24 before discontinuing the series.

Alternate binding
Some copies of Volumes 20 through 24 are bound in green cloth with gold stamping similar to the original Garland editions. Apparently Bowker allowed a distributor that bought the Garland inventory of Variety Film Reviews to bind post-1986 volumes to match the earlier books.

Volumes and years covered

Other reprints of film reviews
Variety is one of the three English-language periodicals with 10,000 or more film reviews reprinted in book form. The other two are
 The New York Times as The New York Times Film Reviews (1913–2000) in 22 volumes.
 Harrison's Reports as Harrison's Reports and Film Reviews''''' (1919–1962) in 15 volumes.

Film guides
Books of film criticism
Variety (magazine)